Mavro Sachs (born Moritz Sachs; 18175 May 1888) was Croatian physician, the first lecturer of the University of Zagreb, founder of the forensic medicine in Croatia and the first Jew who officially became citizen of Zagreb.

Life and education
Sachs was born in Jánosháza to a notable Czech Jewish family of Emanuel Sachs. He had a brother, Eduard. In 1828, Sachs and his family moved to Zagreb where he was educated. He attended the Medical University of Vienna from which he successfully graduated on 25 April 1846. He was the first Croatian Jew who has completed the university studies and who has been awarded with doctoral degree. Sachs was married to Graziella (née Fritz) Sachs, with whom he had a son and two daughters; Hinko, Viktorija and Matilda. At the time he was a close friend with the most prominent Croatians such as, Count Josip Jelačić and Roman Catholic bishop Josip Juraj Strossmayer.

Career and later life
When he returned to Zagreb from Vienna, Sachs worked as the city and county physician. In 1848, Sachs joined and served as the physician in Austrian Empire army under Count Josip Jelačić. In 1849, he was the first to teach the forensic medicine at the Zagreb "Royal Academy of Science" and "Faculty of Social Sciences". From 1868, Sachs taught in the status of private docent at the "Faculty of Law" (former "Royal Academy of Science") of University of Zagreb. Sachs also taught hygiene at the "Academy Dr. Moric Weiss". As a member of the Zagreb Medical Society (founded in 1845) he attended the first physicians assembly of Kingdom of Croatia and Slavonia held in Zagreb on 14 June 1850. At that assembly it was requested the establishment of a medical college and midwifery school with teaching in Croatian. Sachs did not limit himself only to theoretical lectures, he also performed the forensic chemical tests and autopsy on cadavers of individual patients who died in the Zagreb "Hospital of merciful brothers" (now "Sveti Duh"). When in the 1862, the Croatian-Slavonian Royal Council formed a committee to establish the University of Zagreb, Sachs, along with physicians Aleks Vancoš and Josip Mlinarić was a member of the audit committee responsible for the preparation of medical school. Sachs also taught at the Zagreb "Faculty of Pharmacy and Biochemistry" of University of Zagreb from 1887. Until his death, Sachs taught "Judicial health care and medical legislation" at the "Faculty of Law" of University of Zagreb. For his merit, Sachs was knighted by Franz Joseph I of Austria. From 1855 to 1860, Sachs was the president of the Jewish community in Zagreb. Under his leadership, parcel for the construction of Zagreb Synagogue was bought. In 1859 the Zagreb Jewish society "Hevra kadiša", founded by Sachs, enacted the statute to help sick parishioners, widows and orphans. Sachs was also a member of the "Društvo čovječnosti" Zagreb (Humanity society), the benefactor society which aided poor and needy.

Death
Sachs died in Rijeka on May 5, 1888 while visiting his son Hinko Sachs pl. Grički, who was the president of the Jewish community in Rijeka.

References

Bibliography

 
 
 

1817 births
1888 deaths
People from Vas County
Croatian Jews
Austro-Hungarian Jews
Croatian Austro-Hungarians
Croatian people of Czech-Jewish descent
Croatian people of Hungarian-Jewish descent
Croatian pathologists
Jewish physicians
Academic staff of the University of Zagreb
Recipients of the Order of Franz Joseph